Jocelyn Elise Crowley (born September 5, 1970) is a Professor of Public Policy at Rutgers University-New Brunswick, where she specializes in family law in the United States.

Early life 
Crowley was born on September 5, 1970, in Englewood, New Jersey. She grew up in Warren Township, New Jersey with her sister Monica Crowley.

Education 
Crowley earned a B.A., summa cum laude, in government with distinguished honors from Cornell University in May 1992. She received her master's degree in public policy from Georgetown University in May 1994, with a specialization in American social policy. In September 1999, Crowley received her Ph.D. in political science from Massachusetts Institute of Technology with a concentration in the field of American politics.

Personal life 
Crowley was married in 2003 to the late American radio and television host Alan Colmes. Her sister is American political commentator and former United States Assistant Secretary of the Treasury for Public Affairs Monica Crowley.

Selected bibliography 

 Crowley, Jocelyn Elise. (2003). The Politics of Child Support in America. New York: Cambridge University Press.  .
 Crowley, Jocelyn Elise. (2008). Defiant Dads: Fathers’ Rights Activists in America. Ithaca, NY: Cornell University Press. .
 Crowley, Jocelyn Elise. (2013). Mothers Unite! Organizing for Workplace Flexibility and the Transformation of Family Life. Ithaca, NY: Cornell University Press. .
 Crowley, Jocelyn Elise. (2018). Gray Divorce: What We Lose and Gain from Mid-Life Splits. Oakland, CA: University of California Press. .

References

External links 
 Faculty page at Rutgers

1970 births
Rutgers University faculty
Cornell University alumni
Living people